The Best of Both Worlds is the first collaborative album by Jay-Z and R. Kelly. It was released on March 19, 2002 through Roc-A-Fella, The Island Def Jam Music Group, Rockland Records and Jive Records. The production on the album was primarily handled by R. Kelly and Poke and Tone, but also features production by Megahertz and Charlemagne. The album also features guest appearances by Beanie Siegel, Lil' Kim and Devin the Dude.

The Best of Both Worlds was supported by three singles: "Honey", "Get This Money" and "Take You Home with Me a.k.a. Body". The album received generally mixed reviews from music critics but despite the poor reviews was a commercial success. The album debuted at number two on the US Billboard 200 chart, selling 223,000 copies in its first week.

Singles
The album spawned three singles from its songs. The first single, "Honey" was released on January 16, 2002 as the lead single for the album. It was produced by R. Kelly and Poke and Tone. The song contains a sample of "Love You Inside Out" by the Bee Gees. The single failed to chart on the US Billboard Hot 100 but managed to peak at number 35 on the UK Singles Chart. The second single, "Get this Money" was released in March 2002. The third single, "Take You Home with Me a.k.a. Body" was released on May 21, 2002. Both of the latter also failed to chart.

Critical reception
The album received generally mixed reviews from music critics. Some critics praised the album while others gave it poor reviews. Jason Birchmeier of AllMusic stated that "while the idea of a collaborative album was a reasonable one, the album falls terribly short of both artists' high standards". He also called the album uninspired and claims it "rates among the poorest efforts -- arguably the poorest -- in either Kelly's or Jay-Z's catalog to date." He gave the album a 2 star rating out of 5.

Steve Jones of USA Today gave the album a better review, calling the album "falls short of genius". He claims "The two charismatic hitmakers mesh well and represent for their respective genres." In addition, he also believes that "They don't, however, really push each other to the next level or break the ground you might expect from this kind of meeting of the minds." He gave the album a 3 star rating out of 4.

In retrospect, Jay-Z said: "I think the first The Best of Both Worlds is amazing".

Commercial performance
The Best of Both Worlds debuted at number two on the US Billboard 200 chart, selling 223,000 copies in its first week. This became Jay-Z's fifth US top-ten album and R. Kelly's fifth on the chart. In its second week, the album dropped to number four on the chart, selling an additional 137,000 copies. In its third week, the album dropped to number six on the chart, selling 82,000 more copies. On May 14, 2002, the album was certified platinum by the Recording Industry Association of America (RIAA) for shipments of over one million copies. In 2002, The Best of Both Worlds was ranked as the 99th most popular album in the US. As of November 2004, the album has sold 875,000 copies in the United States.

Track listing

Notes
 signifies a co-producer

Charts

Weekly charts

Year-end charts

Certifications

References

2002 albums
R. Kelly albums
Jay-Z albums
Albums produced by R. Kelly
Albums produced by Trackmasters
Def Jam Recordings albums
Jive Records albums
Roc-A-Fella Records albums
Collaborative albums